Veldurthy is a village in Palnadu district of the Indian state of Andhra Pradesh. It is located in Veldurthi mandal of Gurazala revenue division.

Geography 
Jerri Vagu is the source of water for the village and its surrounding areas.

Governance 

Veldurthi gram panchayat is the local self-government of the village.

References 

Villages in Palnadu district